Marco Maronese (born 25 December 1994) is an Italian cyclist, who last rode for UCI Professional Continental team .

Major results

2015
 7th Circuito del Porto
2016
 1st Circuito del Porto
2018
 2nd International Rhodes Grand Prix
2019
 5th Poreč Trophy

References

External links

1994 births
Living people
Italian male cyclists
Cyclists from the Province of Treviso